Tamara Stepanovna Maliukova Sidorenko (15 February 1919 - 2005) was a Ukrainian composer, music educator and pianist.

Sidorenko was born in Odessa. She studied piano at the Nikolayev Music School and graduated from the Odessa Conservatory in 1946, where she studied composition with Serafim D. Orfeyev. Sidorenko taught at the Odessa Conservatory and later chaired the composition and theory department at the Odessa Music School until 1970. Her students included Oleksandr Krasotov. 

Sideorenko arranged many Czech, Polish, Russian, and Ukrainian folk songs. She wrote music for unspecified films and television programs; composed cantatas based on texts by L. Barabanov, V. Bobrov, Andrei Voznesensky, and E. Yanvarov; choruses based on texts by Nikolay Nekrasov, Taras Shevchenko, and Lesya Ukrainka; and songs based on texts by V. Karpeko, Federico García Lorca, Roberto Fernandez Retamar, Shevchenko, A. Tolstoy, S. Vasiliev, Sergei Yesenin, and others.  Her instrumental compositions included:

Chamber 

Kolkhoz String Quartet

Pieces for Cello and Piano

Pieces for Viola
String Quartet No. 1

String Quartet No. 2 on Ukrainian Themes

Orchestra 

Bogdan Khmeinitzky Overture 

Suite of Ancient Dances 

Symphony No. 1 

Symphony No. 2 

Symphony No. 3

Piano 

Cycle Piece in Old Style

Preludes

Sonatas

References 

Ukrainian composers
Women composers
String quartet composers
2005 deaths
1919 births